Jaus Records is an independent record label and recording studio from Oviedo, Asturias, Spain, created on 2002 exclusively to record and support the works by Spanish power metal band WarCry. It has recorded and helped to release every single work by the band, except for the demo Demon 97, which was released on 1997 when the band was still a side project from the members original groups. They had the idea to support other bands, preferably from Asturias, Spain. But in an interview to WarCry's front-man Víctor García he commented that this needs a lot of responsibility, sacrifice, and work, and it could be a better option to support the bands' best works only.

Works released 
All the works released by WarCry.
 2002 — WarCry
 2002 — El Sello De Los Tiempos
 2004 — Alea Jacta Est
 2005 — ¿Dónde Está La Luz?
 2006 — Directo A La Luz [live]
 2006 — La Quinta Esencia
 2008 — Revolución

See also 
 List of record labels
 List of record labels starting with J

References

External links
Official website

WarCry (band)
Spanish record labels
Record labels established in 2001
Asturian music